The Jackson Historic District is a historic district in the city of Jackson, Alabama. Jackson was founded in 1816 and is the oldest incorporated settlement in Clarke County. The historic district features examples of Greek Revival, Queen Anne, Colonial Revival, and regional vernacular architecture. It is a part of the Clarke County Multiple Property Submission and was placed on the National Register of Historic Places on January 23, 1998.

References

External links

National Register of Historic Places in Clarke County, Alabama
Historic districts in Clarke County, Alabama
Greek Revival architecture in Alabama
Colonial Revival architecture in Alabama
Queen Anne architecture in Alabama
Historic districts on the National Register of Historic Places in Alabama